Kangsha River (also known as the Kangsai or the Kangsabati) is a river in the northern parts of Mymensingh and Netrakona districts of Bangladesh. The Someshwari is one of the rivers that join it from the north.

Course
At Gaglajuri the Dhanu is joined by the Kangsha which coming from the Garo Hills past Nalitabari as the Bhogai is at its best in the Netrakona subdivision at Deotukon and Barhatta. After Mohanganj it becomes a narrow winding khal with banks little higher than its own lowest level.

The river flows past Barhatta, Mohanganj and Dharampasha. The Dhala and Dhanu rivers which flow into Kishoreganj District are branches of Kangsha. The Kangsha flows into Surma River in Sunamganj District.

Watershed

According to a report on wetland protection, "All floodwaters come from the Garo/Meghalaya Hills through a number of hill streams and rivers."

Gallery

See also

References

Rivers of Bangladesh